Alexander Sergei Tuzhilin (born 1957) is a Professor of Data Science and Information Systems and the Leonard N. Stern Endowed Professor of Business at New York University's Stern School of Business. 

Professor Tuzhilin is known for his work on personalization, recommender systems, machine learning and AI, where he has made several contributions, including being instrumental in developing the area of Context-Aware Recommender Systems (CARS), proposing novel methods of providing unexpected and cross-domain recommendations based on the principles of deep-learning, developing novel approaches to customer segmentation, and discovery of unexpected patterns in data.

Education 
Tuzhilin received his B.A. in Mathematics from the New York University in 1980, M.S. in Engineering Economics from the Department of Management Science and Engineering at Stanford University in 1981, and Ph.D. in computer science from NYU's Courant Institute of Mathematical Sciences in 1989, his doctoral advisor being Zvi Kedem.

Research 
Tuzhilin researches data mining in databases, personalization, recommender systems, and customer relationship management.

In 2006, Tuzhilin was hired by Google and given access to its monitoring systems to do a study on click fraud. This was part of a class-action settlement requiring Google to offer advertisers up to $60 million in refunds. Tuzhilin concluded that defining and tracking click fraud will be difficult, because it is often not possible to decipher whether Web surfers were clicking on an advertising link out of malice or as part of an innocent online excursion.

Patents 
In 2001, Tuzhilin patented a method of building customer profiles and using them to recommend products and services. Tuzhilin said of the patent, 'It's very broad and very general, and occupies some prime real estate in this space. It essentially covers technologies that are crucial for implementation of customer relationship management.' He added that the patent was careful not to stipulate that the technology was designed for Internet applications. Others pointed out that there were legal exceptions to business methods patents. Any individuals or companies that can show they have been engaged in a business practice for at least a year before a patent application for that practice was filed may be able to circumvent the patent.

In March 2012, Yahoo sued Facebook for violating 10 of its patents. Facebook countersued Yahoo, claiming that it violated Facebook patents that covered 80% of the Yahoo's 2011 revenues. Three of Facebook's patents were originally granted to Tuzhilin.

References

External links

New York University Stern School of Business faculty
Living people
1957 births
Courant Institute of Mathematical Sciences alumni
American information theorists
Data scientists
Data miners
Information systems researchers
20th-century American scientists
21st-century American scientists
Stanford University School of Engineering alumni
American university and college faculty deans